Predominance is the debut album by the Norwegian thrash metal band Susperia. Produced at the Abyss Studios, it combines thrash metal with black metal.

Track listing 
"I Am Pain" – 4:34
"Vainglory" – 4:35
"Illusions of Evil" – 5:44
"Specimen" – 3:57
"Journey into Black" – 3:50
"Of Hate We Breed" – 4:57
"Objects of Desire" – 4:03
"The Hellchild" – 4:43
"Blood on My Hands" – 5:14
"The Coming of a Darker Time" – 3:34

Personnel 
Athera – vocals
Cyrus – lead guitar
Elvorn – rhythm guitar
Memnock – bass
Tjodalv – drums

References 

2001 debut albums
Susperia albums